The Combustion Integrated Rack (CIR) is an experiment facility installed in the International Space Station (ISS).  It includes an optics bench, combustion chamber, fuel and oxidizer control, and five different cameras for performing combustion experiments in microgravity.

The Fluids and Combustion Facility (FCF) accommodates the unique challenges of working with fluids and combustion processes in microgravity and provides services and capabilities comparable to those found in traditional Earth-based laboratories. The FCF occupies two powered racks on the ISS:  the Combustion Integrated Rack (CIR) and the Fluids Integrated Rack (FIR). The FCF is a permanent modular, multi-user facility that accommodates microgravity science experiments on board the ISS. The FCF supports sustained, systematic research in the disciplines of fluid physics and combustion science.

The CIR is used to perform combustion experiments in microgravity. The CIR can be reconfigured easily on orbit to accommodate a variety of combustion experiments. It consists of an optics bench, a combustion chamber, a fuel and oxidizer management system, environmental management systems, and interfaces for science diagnostics and experiment specific equipment. For diagnostic purposes, five different cameras are available for use by the investigator. The CIR features a 100-litre combustion chamber surrounded by optical equipment and diagnostic packages, including a gas chromatograph. Experiments are conducted by remote control from the Glenn Research Center (GRC) Telescience Support Center (TSC).

The CIR has been designed for use with the Passive Rack Isolation System (PaRIS), which connects the rack to the ISS structure using eight spring-damper isolators and a special set of umbilicals. Modelling and analysis show that the PaRIS can attenuate much of the U.S. Laboratory's vibration and provide a much quieter environment than a simple hard-mounted rack. The CIR is the only combustion research facility on board the ISS.

Facility Operations
The Combustion Integrated Rack (CIR) chamber can operate at low (0.02 atm) or high (up to 3 atm) atmospheric pressures. Tools are not required to open the chamber or change or service the eight windows on the chamber. Gases are delivered through the bottles on the front of the rack. The exhaust package features a filter that can recycle the gas used or convert it to an expellable gas. The CIR can be used to explore droplet, solid fuel, and gaseous fuel combustion.

See also
Scientific research on the ISS

Gallery

References

External links
 The FCF Combustion Integrated Rack: Microgravity Combustion Science Onboard [sic] the International Space Station - NASA
 The Fluids and Combustion Facility: Enabling the Exploration of Space - NASA
 ISS Fluids and Combustion Facility - ISS Research Program - NASA, Glenn

Science facilities on the International Space Station
Destiny (ISS module)